Sidney Dara Blandford (June 12, 1868 – November 28, 1929) was a lawyer and political figure in Newfoundland. He represented Bonavista in the Legislative Assembly of Newfoundland and Labrador from 1904 to 1913 as a Conservative and then as a member of the People's Party. His first name appears in some sources as Sydney.

He was born in Greenspond, the son of Samuel Blandford. He was educated in St. John's and practised law there. He served in the Executive Council as Minister of Agriculture and Mines. Blandford was defeated when he ran for reelection in 1913. He was named to the Legislative Council of Newfoundland in the same year, serving until 1917, when he was named High Sheriff. Blandford was one of the founding owners of the Newfoundland Hotel in St. John's.

His uncle Darius Blandford also served in the Newfoundland assembly.

References 
 

Members of the Legislative Council of Newfoundland
Newfoundland People's Party MHAs
1868 births
1929 deaths
Newfoundland Colony people
Dominion of Newfoundland politicians